Madeline and the Gypsies is a children's picture book by Ludwig Bemelmans featuring Bemelman's popular character Madeline. It was first published in 1959 by Viking Press under the Viking Juvenile imprint.

Plot
Pepito, the son of the Spanish Ambassador, invites Madeline and her fellow students to a Gypsy carnival. However, in the chaos caused by a sudden rainstorm, Miss Clavel and the other girls lose sight of Madeline and Pepito, who are unintentionally left behind on the Ferris wheel. The two children find themselves guests of the gypsies, and soon wind up part of the carnival themselves.

Adaptations 
According to a review in Publishers Weekly, an element from this book is rehashed in a different setting for the posthumously published Madeline book Madeline in America and Other Holiday Tales.

A 1966 Czech-American animated film titled Alice of Wonderland in Paris briefly adapts the story, along with four other short stories.

In 2008, it was adapted into a musical, with script by Barry Kornhauser and score by Michael Koerner, which premiered at The Children's Theater Company in Minneapolis, MN.

References

External links 
 Publishers Weekly
 

1959 children's books
American picture books
Children's fiction books
Viking Press books
Books adapted into plays
Fictional representations of Romani people

Madeline